HMS Teazer was a  built by the White shipyard for the Royal Navy. She was launched on 9 February 1895, and sold for scrapping on 9 July 1912.

Service history
Later the same month, she was damaged by running into a jetty, and relieved from tender duties while receiving repairs. She then took up the position as tender to Vernon, serving as such until early 1901. She served in the Portsmouth instructional flotilla until April 1902, when her crew was transferred to the destroyer , which took her place in the flotilla. Later in 1902, she underwent repairs to re-tube her boilers.

Teazer was sold for scrap on 9 July 1912 for £1820.

Notes

Bibliography
 
 
 
 
 
 
 

 

Conflict-class destroyers
Ships built on the Isle of Wight
1895 ships
A-class destroyers (1913)